Nothoadmete delicatula is a species of sea snail, a marine gastropod mollusk in the family Cancellariidae, the nutmeg snails.

Nothaodmete delicatula has a pale, grayish-white spiral shell approximately 5mm in length.

Specimens of this species have been collected in the Ross Sea, off the coast of Antarctica, as well as off of that part of the Antarctic coast that faces Australia.

References

External links
 http://invertebrates.si.edu/antiz/taxon_view.cfm?ScreenWidth=1003&ScreenHeight=567&TAXON=6697&MODE=taxon

Cancellariidae
Gastropods described in 1907